Găunoasa River may refer to:

 Găunoasa, a tributary of the Bistrița in Gorj County
 Găunoasa, a tributary of the Holbav in Brașov County

See also 
 Găunoșița River